Sarah Abitbol (born 8 June 1975) is a French former competitive pair skater. With skating partner Stéphane Bernadis, she is the 2000 World bronze medalist, the 2000 Grand Prix Final silver medalist, a seven-time European medalist (two silver and five bronze medals), and a ten-time French national champion.

Early life and career 
Born in Nantes, France, Abitbol began skating at the age of six, choosing skating over swimming. She initially took lessons and practiced in that area. In 1992, at the age of 17, she teamed up with Stéphane Bernadis to compete in pair skating. Abitbol/Bernadis were coached by Jean-Roland Racle early in their career, followed by Stanislav Leonovich in Paris.

At the 2000 World Championships in Nice, France, Bernadis said he was attacked by an unknown assailant with a razor on 28 March when he opened his hotel room door. He suffered an eight-inch cut down his left forearm. Bernadis said he had received a death threat three weeks earlier. At the event, he and Abitbol won the bronze medal, becoming the first French pair skaters to win a World medal since 1932, when Andrée Brunet / Pierre Brunet won gold in this competition.

When Bernadis became injured after performing the short program, the pair had to withdraw from the 2001 World Championships. They qualified for the 2002 Olympics by winning the 2001 Golden Spin of Zagreb. Abitbol/Bernadis withdrew from the 2002 Olympics after Abitbol's Achilles tendon ruptured in practice; she underwent surgery and was off the ice for six months. After the 2003 European Championships, the pair changed coaches, moving to Jean-Christophe Simond.

Abitbol/Bernadis worked on throw triple Axels.

Personal life
Abitbol married Jean-Louis Lacaille in 2009. Their daughter, Stella, was born in June 2011. 

In January 2020, Abitbol published a memoir, Such A Long Silence (Un si long silence). In it, she accused her former singles coach Gilles Beyer of sexual assault, stating it began in 1990 when she was 15 and continued over a period of two years. This triggered a scandal that led to the resignation that year of FFSG president Didier Gailhaguet over his alleged covering up of past allegations against Beyer, in addition to cover ups of other cases. 

While the assaults reported by Abitbol occurred outside the time limits of the statutes of limitations, Beyer was subsequently charged with sexual assault and harassment in cases relating to six other students who came forward with allegations of more recent events. In addition, Sports Minister Roxana Mărăcineanu ordered a broader investigation of the prevalence of sexual abuse in French sports culture. This concluded with reports of misconduct by more than 400 individuals.

Programs 
(with Bernadis)

Results 
with Bernadis

GP: Champions Series / Grand Prix

See also
List of select Jewish figure skaters

References

External links

 
 Official website of Abitbol / Bernadis 

1975 births
Olympic figure skaters of France
Figure skaters at the 1998 Winter Olympics
French female pair skaters
Living people
Jewish French sportspeople
World Figure Skating Championships medalists
European Figure Skating Championships medalists
Sportspeople from Nantes